Elaine Richardson (born September 23, 1940) is an American politician who served in the Arizona House of Representatives from the 11th district from 1993 to 1997 and in the Arizona Senate from the 11th district from 1997 to 2003.

References

1940 births
Living people
Democratic Party members of the Arizona House of Representatives
Democratic Party Arizona state senators
20th-century American politicians
20th-century American women politicians
21st-century American politicians
21st-century American women politicians
Politicians from Providence, Rhode Island